Rackl is a surname. Notable people with the surname include:

Markus Rackl (born 1969), German tennis player
Michael Rackl (1883–1948), German Roman Catholic bishop